Gerinuiyeh (also Romanized as Gerīnū’īyeh; also known as Garīnow and Gerīnū) is a village in Javaran Rural District, Hanza District, Rabor County, Kerman Province, Iran. At the 2006 census, its population was 144, in 34 families.

References 

Populated places in Rabor County